William Bennet may refer to:

William Bennet (MP for Ripon) (died 1609), MP for Ripon
William Bennet (bishop) (1746–1820), Bishop of Cloyne and antiquary
William Bennet (musician) (1767?–1833?), English musician
William Stiles Bennet (1870–1962), American politician
William S. Bennet II (1934–2009), American business executive
William Bennet (engineer) (active 1790–1826), English canal engineer (also spelled Bennett)
Sir William Bennet, 1st Baronet (died 1710) of the Bennet baronets
Sir William Bennet, 2nd Baronet (died 1729), member of 1st Parliament of Great Britain
Sir William Bennet, 3rd Baronet (died 1733) of the Bennet baronets

See also
William Bennett (disambiguation)
William Benet (disambiguation)